Water polo was contested for men only at the 1995 Pan American Games in Mar del Plata, Argentina.

Competing teams
Seven teams contested the event.

Medalists

References

 Pan American Games water polo medalists on HickokSports

P
Events at the 1995 Pan American Games
1995
1995